Byomkesh is a Bengali streaming television series based on the Byomkesh Bakshi character created by Sharadindu Bandyopadhyay. Set in the 1930s, the series is based on the adventures of Byomkesh, and his friend and biographer Ajit, who usually accompanies Bakshi during his investigations. Anirban Bhattacharya portrays the lead role of Byomkesh, with Subrat Dutta in the role of Byomkesh's trusted friend-turned-aide, Ajit. The first episode premiered on Saturday, October 14, 2017, being the first Byomkesh series to be available on OTT platform hoichoi worldwide.

Cast 
Anirban Bhattacharya as Byomkesh Bakshi
Subrat Dutta as Ajit Kumar Banerjee (Season 1 to Season 3)
Ridhima Ghosh as Satyabati, Byomkesh's wife
Suprobhat Das as Ajit Kumar Banerjee (Since Season 4)
Tarun Chakraborty as Inspector Bidhu Bhattacharya
Arjun Chakraborty as Himangsu Chowdhury
 Aryann Bhowmik as Satyakam Das
 Saptarshi Roy as Ushapati Das
 Tulika Basu as Suchitra Das
 Abanti Mohan Banerjee as Ramakanta Chowdhury
 Rupsha Chatterjee as Annapurna
 Oindrila Saha as Chumki
 Ratan Sarkhel as Dhananjay Mondal
 Gopal Talukder as Nanda Ghosh
 Bhaskar Banerjee as Nripati Laha
 Monu Mukherjee as Nandadulal Babu
 Indrasish Roy as Abhay Ghoshal
 Mrinal Mukherjee as Maharaj Ramendra Singh
 Arindol Bagchi as Haripada
 Biswajit Sarkar as Ramanath Neogi
 Parthasarathi Deb as Ashutosh Deb
 Koushik Kar as Prafulla Ray
 Debranjan Nag as Anukul Babu
 Dulal Lahiri as Korali Babu
 Fahim Mirza as Sukumar, Satyabati's elder brother
 Sourav Chatterjee as Fanibhushan
 Amrita Chattopadhyay as Deepa Bhatta
 Raja Goswami as Debasish Bhatta
 Tamal Roy Chowdhury as Deepa's Grandfather
 Joyjit Banerjee as Prabal Gupta
 Debdut Ghosh as Dr. Rudra 
 Janardan Ghosh as Debkumar Mitra,a scientist
 Nandini Chatterjee as Subhra Mitra, Debkumar's wife
 Gambhira Bhattacharya as Habul
 Priyanka Bhattacharjee as Rekha
 Arun Bannerjee as Rameshwar Roy
 Soumya Sengupta as Dr. Asim Sen
 Raajhorshee Dey as Bishu Pal
 Soumyabrata Rakshit as Dr.Suresh Rakshit
 Debshankar Haldar as Santosh Samaddar
 Soumendra Bhattacharya as Uday Samaddar
 Sawon Chakraborty as Jugal Samaddar
 Krishnendu Dewanji as Ravi Verma
 Darshana Banik as Hena Mallick
 Rukma Roy as Sukumari
 Ujaan Chatterjee as Nengti
 Arunima Haldar as Chingri
 Indrajit Mazumder as Inspector Atul Krishna Ray aka A K Ray
 Ushasi Ray as Iman Devi
 Chandan Sen as Kaligoti Upadhyay

Season 1 
Season 1 of the Byomkesh is based on four stories, 'Satyaneshi', 'Pather Kanta, 'Artham Anartham' and 'Makorshar Rosh' written by Bengali author Sharadindu Bandyopadhyay. The season was released on 14 October 2017 with two episodes, this season was directed by Sayantan Ghoshal and  the second series was released on 16 December 2017.

Episodes

Season 2 
In Season 2, Byomkesh will solve the mystery of Satyakam's murder. This series is based on 'Raketr Dag' another best seller in the Byomkesh. The first episode of the Season 2 was launched on 16 December 2017, later on, two other episodes are also being released by hoichoi. First two episodes were directed by Soumik Chattopadhyay, and the third episode was directed by Sayantan Ghoshal.

Episodes

Season 3 
Season 3 of the Byomkesh is based on the story Shajaru’r Kanta written by author Sharadindu Bandopadhyay. In this season Byomkesh investigates a series of murders that were committed by someone using a sharpened porcupine quill.

Episodes

Season 4 
Byomkesh season 4 is based on Bengali author Sharadindu Bandopadhyay's ‘Agnibaan’. The story starts with a young girl Rekha, Byomkesh's neighbor, who dies under some mysterious circumstances in her kitchen. Byomkesh takes charge of this investigation and from here the investigation of Byomkesh begun.

Episodes

Season 5 
Byomkesh season 5 started streaming from 10 January 2020. The season is directed by Soumik Halder based on Sharadindu Bandyopadhyay's original story 'Dushtochakra' and 'Khnuji Khnuji Nari'. All the cast remains the same except this time Suprobhat Das plays the role of Ajit.

Episodes

Season 6 
Byomkesh season 6 started streaming from 8 January 2021. The season is directed by Soumik Halder based on Sharadindu Bandyopadhyay's original story 'Mogno Mainak'.

Episodes

Season 7 
Byomkesh season 7 released on 4 November 2021 at Diwali eve. The season is directed by Soumik Halder based on Sharadindu Bandyopadhyay's original story 'Chorabali'.

Episodes

Season 8
On 20th September 2022, Hoichoi announced the new season of Byomkesh. It is based on Chiriyakhana, a story on which filmmaker Satyajit Ray had made his only Byomkesh movie Chiriyakhana, starring Uttam Kumar. This time, Bhattacharya himself takes over the show as a showrunner, his second time after Mandaar. Mandaar's co-writer Pratik Dutta has been roped in this series also. It is directed by Sudipto Roy.

References

External links

Bengali-language web series
Byomkesh Bakshi
Hoichoi original programming
Films based on works by Saradindu Bandopadhyay